Mincivan is a town in the Zangilan District of Azerbaijan.

History 
Mincivan was part of the Zangezur Uyezd of the Elisabethpol Governorate in the Russian Empire.

The town was located in the Armenian-occupied territories surrounding Nagorno-Karabakh, coming under the control of ethnic Armenian forces in 1993 during the First Nagorno-Karabakh War.

The town subsequently became part of the breakaway Republic of Artsakh as part of its Kashatagh Province, referred to as Mijnavan.

It was recaptured by Azerbaijan on 21 October 2020 during the 2020 Nagorno-Karabakh war.

Demographics 
According to the Soviet census of 1933, Mincivan town of Zangilan District of Azerbaijan SSR had 322 residents (169 men, 153 women). The entire village council (the villages of Bakharly, Dellakli and Tarakeme), whose center was Minjivan, consisted solely of Azerbaijanis. Mincivan had 5,506 residents in 1989.

The town had 344 inhabitants in 2005, and 300 inhabitants in 2015.

Gallery

References

External links 

 
 World Gazetteer: Azerbaijan – World-Gazetteer.com

Populated places in Zangilan District